Frække Frida og de frygtløse spioner (English: Naughty Frida and the Fearless Spies), often shortened to simply Frække Frida, is a 1994 Danish children's film written and directed by Søren Ole Christensen. Christensen based the story on a series of children's books by Lykke Nielsen. Music for the film was written and performed by Søren Rasted and Claus Norreen who later teamed up with René Dif and Lene Nystrøm later in 1994 to form the Bubblegum/eurodance music group, Joyspeed (later renamed to Aqua).

Cast

Soundtrack

The film itself is not particularly well-known, but the soundtrack formed an important part during Aqua's (then Joyspeed) early days. It is often credited with helping to start their career. The young producers Søren Rasted and Claus Norreen had won a contest and were hired to produce the soundtrack. For some of the songs they hired the then club DJ René Dif. The three had previously not been associated with each other, but their getting along well whilst making the soundtrack made them decide to work together again on a future project. The future project would ultimately eventually lead to the creation and success of Aqua, with Lene Nystrøm as their lead vocalist.

Track titles
 De frygtløse spioner (featuring Thomas Skovgaard) 
 Nattens fe (featuring Peter Smith) 
 Frække Frida (featuring Annette Brandt, Mathias Klenske, Gunilla Odsbøl & Ida Hannibal Kruse) 
 Si-bab-rapper-di-åhh (featuring Arne Siemsen, René Dif & Annette Brandt) 
 Når jeg blir stor (featuring Alice Søndergård & Annette Brandt) 
 Gunnersen (featuring Arne Siemsen) 
 Godmorgen (featuring Thomas Skovgaard) 
 Den magiske kasse (featuring Annette Brandt, Mathias Klenske, Gunilla Odsbøl & Ida Hannibal Kruse) 
 Hele verden rundt (featuring Alice Søndergård) 
 Ønskebrønd (featuring Peter Smith & Søren Rasted) 
 Devil's child 
 Flugten 
 Si-bab-rapper-di-åhh (Dance Mix) (featuring Arne Siemsen, René Dif & Annette Brandt) 
 Frække Frida (featuring Christine Havkrog)

External links
 
 Aquarama: "Article: First 'Aqua' work: Frække Frida soundtrack"
 Aquarama: Frække Frida lyrics & english translations

1994 films
Danish children's films
Aqua (band)
Films based on children's books
Films based on Danish novels
1990s Danish-language films